Sarni is a town located in the Betul District of Madhya Pradesh. It is administered by the Municipal Council Sarni, which oversees four contiguous settlements of Sarni, Pathakhera, Shobhapur Colony and Bagdona. The town is known for its industrial setup and natural beauty, with the Tawa River running through it and being surrounded by lush green forests. It is an important industrial hub with the Satpura Thermal Power Station and Pathakhera Area Coal Mines of Western Coalfields Limited located in the surrounding areas. These industries contribute to the economy of the town and make it an important centre for power generation and coal mining. Sarni is also known for its Mathardev temple at the hilltop, making it a popular tourist destination.

History
Sarni is located in a part of the Gondwana tract after the Gond tribe, who chiefly inhabited this area and practised shifting cultivation.

In the fourteenth and fifteenth century, this area of Gonds was infiltrated by Rajputs and who, by the time of Mughals, had succeeded in reclaiming several parts of the Narmada valley for agriculture. The Gonds were pushed to higher plateaus and slopes to continue hunting and their shifting cultivation. This area saw unrest due to the tension between the Marathas and the Mughals during the seventeenth and eighteenth century. During the year 1818, the area saw the advent of British rule.

Transport
Transportation in Sarni is primarily served by road and railway. The nearest airports are Raja Bhoj International Airport in Bhopal, approximately 200 km (120 mi) north of Sarni, and Dr. Babasaheb Ambedkar International Airport in Nagpur, approximately 225 km (140 mi) south of Sarni.

The nearest railway station is Ghoradongri railway station (station code GDYA), which is 18 km (11 mi) from Sarni. An all-weather road connects Sarni to Nagpur-Bhopal National Highway (NH 69) at Baretha, making it easily accessible from both nearby airports of Bhopal and Nagpur.
Additionally, Sarni is connected to Chhindwara through Madhya Pradesh State Highway 43 (Betul-Sarni-Parasia).

Demographics
The Sarni Municipality has population of 86,141 of which 44,928 are males while 41,213 are females as per report released by Census India 2011.  Population of Children with age of 0-6 is 8096 which is 9.40% of total population of Sarni (M). In Sarni Municipality, Female Sex Ratio is of 917 against state average of 931. Moreover, Child Sex Ratio in Sarni is 927 compared to Madhya Pradesh state average of 918. The total literacy rate of Sarni was 84.59% in 2011 which is greater than average literacy rate 69.32% of Madhya Pradesh. Population-wise, out of total 66,018 literates, males are 36,675 while females are 29,343. Also the male literacy rate is 90.05% and the female literacy rate is 78.63% in Sarni. Schedule Caste (SC) constitutes 25% while Schedule Tribe (ST) were 9.5% of total population in Sarni.

The population of the city has decreased by -9.3% in the last 10 years. In the 2001 census total population here were about 95 thousand. The female population growth rate of the city is -8.6% which is 1.4% higher than the male population growth rate of -10%.

Weather
Sarni is gifted with good weather conditions by nature all through the year, but monsoon is the best season to visit because nature is at its best and forests, mountains, valley and waterfalls come alive in the rainy season. The coldest month is January and the warmest month is May. The yearly average rainfall of the city is 1069.2 mm. Maximum temperature here reaches up to 42.5 °C and minimum temperature goes down to 5.4 °C.

Municipal Council of Sarni
The Municipal Council of Sarni consists of 36 Wards (Sarni13+Pathakhera17+Sobhapur Colony, Bagdona 6). There are one president and vice president of the municipal committee who are responsible for its proper functioning.

Festivals
All major religious and national festivals of India are celebrated with enthusiasm in Sarni. A distinct feature of Sarni is an annual fortnight long fair on the festival of Makar Sankranti in the month of January. The fair was first started in 1978 by a group of followers of Mathardev who started a project to create a shrine in order to organize and institutionalize the visitors. Since then it has become an annual affair.

The fair is organised by the temple committee Mathardev Mela Samiti with the help of the Municipal Council of Sarni. Traders across the region come to the fair to sell goods including religious items, artefacts, ornaments, clothes, toys, simple household goods, etc. Several acrobats, snake charmers, musicians and other artists attract crowds.

Places of interest

Sarni is surrounded by Satpura mountain. In the vicinity are the Satpura hill ranges, valleys, plains, deep valleys, dense forests and water bodies including rivers, fountains and a dam.

In the Monsoon season, the entire view turns green. Mornings and evenings are generally misty giving it a surreal feel.
One of the best place to visit is Shri Ram Mandir. There are several places of interest like Satpura Dam, Rajdoh: here two 500 kW Hydel Electric Power Generators are installed the power plant is callled as Micro Mini, the pathway is flanked on one side by an artificial canal. 
Amrut Fall: (Named after a farmer) in Karanji village is a waterfall. 
Ret Ghat on Damua Road: White sand deposit brought by Tawa river makes it a spot for picnics.. 
Heera Palla: Situated near Shobhapur. This place has a small river and rocks. One can hire a fisherman's boat to take a boat ride on this shallow river.
Ash Dam: here ash from the Thermal Power Plant is disposed of.
Bhopali: here on every Mahashivratri a fair is organized. This fair has religious importance for the locals.
Hanuman Temple: A very old Temple of Hanuman is on Ranipur road.
Jamun Jhiriya: This place is a source of natural mineral water for the local residents.

Mathardev Temple

The peak as well as the temple are named after a legendary tribal chief named Mathardev. The legendary chief commands a strong following among the local and neighbouring population.

The path to the peak is a steep trek climbing two hills. It takes approximately one hour of continuous climb to reach the top.

The hilltop also provides a view of the surrounding mountain ranges, Satpura dam and a bird's eye view of the town below.

Satpura Dam

Satpura Dam is a man-made lake created as a reservoir for the Power Plant. The reservoir is surrounded by dense forests and hills. A road traverses through a local hillock to reach the lake and is used for strolls and leisurely walks by the local populace. The dam is a tourist cum picnic spot.

Satpura Thermal Power Station

Sarni is home to the Satpura Thermal Power Station which is a Coal-fired power station having an installed capacity of 1330 MW, making it the third-largest power plant of MPPGCL. The town Sarni was established and developed due to the establishment of the Satpura Thermal Power Station at Sarni.

Education

There are many government, private and NGO run schools and colleges in Sarni and nearby towns and villages, major among them are:-

 Kendriya Vidyalaya, Sarni, affiliated to CBSE, is an English medium Co-Ed Higher Secondary School.
 Higher Secondary School , Pathakheda (known as Bada school)
 Government Boys Higher Secondary School, Sarni.
 Government Girls Higher Secondary School, Sarni. 
 M.G.M. Higher Secondary School, Bagdona.
 Little Flower Higher Secondary School, Pathakhera.
 St. Marks English Medium Higher Secondary School, Sarni.
 St. Francis Higher Secondary School, Patakhera (not to be confused with Pathakhera).
 Akhil Vishwa Adarsh Gayatri Vidhya Peeth, Sarni.
 Saraswati Vidhya Mandir, Sarni
 Government College, Bagdona.
 Sardar Vishnu Singh Gond Government College, Bagdona, Sarni.
 Netaji Subhash Chandra Bose College, Sarni.
 Indira Gandhi Girls B.Ed College, Bagdona.
 Dr. Ram Manohar Lohiya College, Badgona, Sarni, Dist.Betul

References

Cities and towns in Betul district